Ovidiu Horșia (born 30 October 2000) is a Romanian professional footballer who plays as a midfielder for Liga I side Universitatea Cluj on loan from FCSB.

Career statistics

Club
Statistics accurate as of match played 17 December 2022.

References

External links
 

2000 births
Living people
Sportspeople from Târgu Mureș
Romanian footballers
Romania youth international footballers
Association football midfielders
Liga I players
Liga II players
FC Steaua București players
FC Steaua II București players
LPS HD Clinceni players
FC Politehnica Iași (2010) players
CS Gaz Metan Mediaș players
FC Unirea Constanța players
FC Universitatea Cluj players